Bassemyam is a city located in the province of Bazèga in Burkina Faso.

Sister cities
Mirebeau, France

Populated places in the Centre-Sud Region
Bazèga Province